Ian Angus (born 19 November 1961) is a Scottish former professional footballer.

Angus started his career in 1980 at Aberdeen, playing in 84 league matches during his seven years at Pittodrie. A 1987 move to Dundee brought a similar number of appearances in only three seasons and saw Angus move to Motherwell. In his first season at Fir Park, he helped them on their way to victory in the Scottish Cup, scoring in the 4–3 win against Dundee United. In 1994, Angus left Motherwell and joined Clyde, playing in the majority of matches over the next two seasons. His finest moment as a Clyde player came when he scored the opening goal against Rangers in the Scottish Cup, though Clyde went on to lose 4–1. A spell at Albion Rovers added a few more appearances. Angus made one League Cup appearance for Stirling Albion at the start of the 1998–99 season.

Honours

Motherwell
Scottish Cup: 1
 1990–91

External links

1961 births
Footballers from Glasgow
Living people
Scottish footballers
Scottish Football League players
Aberdeen F.C. players
Dundee F.C. players
Motherwell F.C. players
Clyde F.C. players
Albion Rovers F.C. players
Association football midfielders
Stirling Albion F.C. players